The following is the qualification system and qualified countries for the Modern pentathlon at the 2023 Pan American Games competitions.

Qualification system
A total of 66 Modern pentathletes will qualify to compete. Each nation may enter a maximum of 6 athletes (three per gender), except for the winners of the individual events at the 2021 Junior Pan American Games. Quotas will be awarded across two qualification tournaments. The host nation, Chile, automatically qualifies four athletes (two per gender). Two quotas (one per gender) will be distributed via the 2021 Junior Pan American Games. The remaining quotas will be awarded per during the 2022 Pan American Championships, with a minimum of one and up to three athletes per gender per country.

Qualification timeline

Qualification summary
The following is the final allocation quota.

Men

Women

References

P
Qualification for the 2023 Pan American Games